SV ADO was a baseball club based in The Hague, the Netherlands. The club's top men's team was a regular participant in the Honkbal Hoofdklasse, the highest level of Dutch baseball. 

The organization dissolved itself in 2015 after declaring bankruptcy. The club had seen years of declining membership and was facing a €40,000 budget shortfall entering the 2015 season.

2011 roster

References

External links
Official site of SV ADO (Dutch)

Baseball teams in the Netherlands
Sports clubs in The Hague